Andrés Espinoza Pérez (born 4 February 1963) is a Mexican former long-distance runner who specialized in marathon races.

Espinosa finished ninth at the 1995 World Championships in 2:16:44 hours. He won the 1993 New York Marathon and achieved his personal best time of 2:07:19 hours at the 1994 Boston Marathon. He set the world masters (+40) record for the marathon in Berlin Marathon 2003 (2:08:46), which lasted nearly a dozen years until it was broken by 2 seconds in 2015 by Evergreen Kenneth Mungara. He also won the Lisbon Half Marathon 1994.

Achievements

Notes

References

marathoninfo

1963 births
Living people
Mexican male long-distance runners
Mexican male marathon runners
Athletes (track and field) at the 2000 Summer Olympics
Athletes (track and field) at the 2004 Summer Olympics
Olympic athletes of Mexico
New York City Marathon male winners
World record holders in masters athletics
Mexican masters athletes
Sportspeople from Monclova
21st-century Mexican people